Lawrence Dobkin (September 16, 1919 – October 28, 2002) was an American television director, character actor and screenwriter whose career spanned seven decades.

Dobkin was a prolific performer during the Golden Age of Radio. He narrated the western Broken Arrow (1950). His film performances include Never Fear (1949), Sweet Smell of Success (1957), North by Northwest (1959) and Geronimo (1962). Before the closing credits of each episode of the  landmark ABC television network series Naked City (1958–1963), he said, "There are eight million stories in the naked city.  This has been one of them."

Early years 
Dobkin was born in New York City.

Radio
Dobkin understudied on Broadway. When he returned to network radio he was one of five actors who played the detective Ellery Queen in The Adventures of Ellery Queen. In The New Adventures of Nero Wolfe (1950–1951), Dobkin played detective Archie Goodwin opposite Sydney Greenstreet's Nero Wolfe.

While playing Louie, The Saint's cab-driving sidekick on NBC Radio in 1951, he was asked to step into the lead role of Simon Templar to replace Tom Conway for a single episode —  making Dobkin one of the few actors to portray Leslie Charteris' literary creation.

His other radio work included Escape (1947–1954), Gunsmoke (1952–1961), Yours Truly, Johnny Dollar (1956–1960), and the anthology series Lux Radio Theater. "The few of us who are left," Dobkin said of his radio days not long before he died, "keep telling each other that we never had it so good."

He was also Lieutenant Matthews on The Adventures of Philip Marlowe, along with several other characters.

Continuing to work as a voice actor throughout his career, Dobkin contributed to the video game Tom Clancy's Rainbow Six: Rogue Spear (1999).

Television
Dobkin began a prolific career in television in 1946, having worked as an actor, narrator and director. In 1953, he guest-starred on Alan Hale, Jr.'s short-lived CBS espionage series set in the Cold War, Biff Baker, U.S.A.. He was cast in a 1957 episode of the syndicated series The Silent Service, in "The Ordeal of the S 38", based on true stories of the submarine division of the United States Navy, in which he was the lead actor and was credited incorrectly as Lawrence Bodkin. He appeared also in the religion anthology series, Crossroads, based on experiences of American clergymen, and later on the ABC religion drama, Going My Way, starring Gene Kelly.

In the 1950s situation comedy I Love Lucy Dobkin played the roles of "Restaurant Man" in episode 66 ("Ricky and Fred Are TV Fans"), "Waiter" in episode 70 ("Equal Rights"), and "Counterfeiter" in episode 145 ("Paris at Last").

In the 1957-1958 television season, Dobkin played a director on the CBS sitcom, Mr. Adams and Eve, starring Howard Duff and Ida Lupino as fictitious married actors residing in Beverly Hills, California. He guest-starred in 1958 in the first season of ABC's The Donna Reed Show.

In 1957, Dobkin appeared in the third episode of the first season of the CBS Television western Have Gun – Will Travel,  entitled "The Great Mohave Chase",  as the owner of water rights in the small western town of Mohave.

In the May 9, 1958 episode of the CBS Television western series Trackdown entitled, "The End of the World," he portrays a con man named Walter Trump who promises to save a town from destruction by building a wall. Internet posts of this episode have gone viral due to its resemblance to real life US President Donald Trump and his controversial policy on immigration.

In 1960, Dobkin appeared as Kurt Reynolds in the episode "So Dim the Light" of the CBS anthology series The DuPont Show with June Allyson, and as an escape artist on the run from a possible murder charge in Wanted: Dead or Alive. That same year he played "Esteban Garcia" (a long time friend of Marshall Dillon where things go very wrong) in the TV Western Gunsmoke, in the episode "Don Matteo" (S6E7). He appeared in the David Janssen crime drama series, Richard Diamond, Private Detective. Dobkin appeared in four episodes of The Rifleman playing four different characters, including a heartfelt portrayal of General Philip Sheridan from the American Civil War. He appeared in an episode of The Tab Hunter Show in 1961. In 1964 he narrated the USIS documentary film about the Republican and Democrat conventions called "1964 The Conventions."

Often also cast as a villain, Dobkin portrayed gangster Dutch Schultz on ABC's The Untouchables. He appeared on the ABC/Warner Bros. crime drama, The Roaring 20s and in the NBC western with a modern setting, Empire. He was cast as a mass murderer in the 1972 pilot for ABC's The Streets of San Francisco, starring Karl Malden. He guest-starred on ABC's The Big Valley, starring Barbara Stanwyck. He received an Emmy Award nomination for Outstanding Performance by an Actor in a Supporting Role in a Drama for his work on the CBS Playhouse episode, Do Not Go Gentle Into That Good Night (1967). In 1991, Dobkin appeared in an episode of the television series Night Court as State Supreme Court Justice Welch.

In the Star Trek media franchise Dobkin directed the original series episode "Charlie X", and later portrayed the traitorous Klingon ambassador Kell on Star Trek: The Next Generation in the fourth-season episode "The Mind's Eye."

As a writer, Dobkin created the title character for the 1974 film and the 1977–1978 NBC series The Life and Times of Grizzly Adams.

He began directing for television in 1960, and his work in this area included episodes 1, 9, 10, and 13 of The Munsters (1964), 16 episodes of The Waltons (1972–1981), and an episode of Sara (1976).

Films
Dobkin's notable supporting film roles include Twelve O'Clock High (1949), The Day the Earth Stood Still (1951),  Julius Caesar (1953), The Ten Commandments (1956), The Defiant Ones (1958), Johnny Yuma (1966) and Patton (1970). He had a cameo appearance in the 1954 sci-fi thriller Them. In an uncredited performance in Alfred Hitchcock's North by Northwest, Dobkin has a memorable line as an intelligence official who remarks on the plight of the hapless protagonist, on the run for murder after being mistaken for a person who doesn't exist: "It's so horribly sad. Why is it I feel like laughing?"

Personal life
On June 24, 1962, Dobkin married actress Joanna Barnes; they had no children, but he had one daughter, Debra Dobkin, by his first wife, Frances Hope Walker. Dobkin married actress Anne Collings in 1970 and had two children: identical twin daughters, Kristy and Kaela.

Death
On October 28, 2002, Dobkin died of heart failure at his home in Los Angeles. He was 83 years old.

Filmography 

Not Wanted (1949) - Assistant District Attorney
Whirlpool (1949) - Surgeon Wayne (uncredited)
Twelve O'Clock High (1949) - Capt. Twombley (uncredited)
Never Fear (1949) - Dr. Middleton
D.O.A. (1950) - Dr. Schaefer
Frenchie (1950) - Bartender
Broken Arrow (1950) - (uncredited)
Chain of Circumstance (1951) - Dr. Callen
People Will Talk (1951) - Business Manager (uncredited)
The Mob (1951) - Clegg's Doctor (uncredited)
Angels in the Outfield (1951) - Rabbi Allen Hahn (uncredited)
The Day the Earth Stood Still (1951) - Army Physician (uncredited)
On the Loose (1951) - Ruegg, Defense Attorney (uncredited)
Bannerline (1951) - Hugo's Doctor (uncredited)
The Living Christ Series (1951) - Caiaphas
Red Skies of Montana (1952) - Leo (uncredited)
The First Time (1952) - Doctor (uncredited)
5 Fingers (1952) - Santos (uncredited)
Deadline - U.S.A. (1952) - Larry Hansen, Rienzi's Lawyer (uncredited)
Loan Shark (1952) - Walter Kerry
Young Man with Ideas (1952) - Prosecutor at Hearing (uncredited)
Diplomatic Courier (1952) - Russian Agent (uncredited)
Washington Story (1952) - Secretary of the Senate (uncredited)
Above and Beyond (1952) - Dr. Van Dyke
Ma and Pa Kettle on Vacation (1953) - U.S. Agent James Farrell (uncredited)
Julius Caesar (1953) - Citizen of Rome 
Remains to Be Seen (1953) - Captain (uncredited)
The Affairs of Dobie Gillis (1953) - Mr. McCandless, Student Advisor (uncredited)
Riders to the Stars (1954) - Dr. Delmar
The Long Wait (1954) - Doctor (uncredited)
Them! (1954) - Los Angeles City Engineer (uncredited)
Sabaka (1954) - General's Aide (uncredited)
The Silver Chalice (1954) - Epharim
Day of Triumph (1954) - Matthew
African Manhunt (1955) - Commentator (voice)
Jump Into Hell (1955) - Maj. Maurice Bonet
Kiss of Fire (1955) - Padre Domingo
Illegal (1955) - Al Carol
The Killer Is Loose (1956) - Bank Robber (uncredited)
That Certain Feeling (1956) - Bit Part (uncredited)
The Ten Commandments (1956) - Hur Ben Caleb
The Badge of Marshal Brennan (1957) - Chicamon
Sweet Smell of Success (1957) - Leo Bartha (uncredited)
Portland Exposé (1957) - Garnell
Raiders of Old California (1957) - Don Miguel Sebastian
The Defiant Ones (1958) - Editor
Wild Heritage (1958) - Josh Burrage
The Lost Missile (1958) - Narrator (voice)
Tokyo After Dark (1959) - Maj. Bradley
North by Northwest (1959) - U.S. Intelligence Agency official (uncredited)
The Big Operator (1959) - Phil Cernak
The Gene Krupa Story (1959) - Speaker Willis
Geronimo (1962) - Gen. George A. Crook
The Cabinet of Caligari (1962) - Dr. Frank David
Johnny Yuma (1966) - Linus Jerome Carradine
Patton (1970) - Colonel Gaston Bell
Underground (1970) - Boule
The Midnight Man (1974) - Mason
Hotwire (1980) - Bodine
Beastmaster 2: Through the Portal of Time (1991) - Admiral Binns

Television
Stagecoach West (1961) - S1 E26 “Fort Wyatt Crossing” - Captain Eli.

The Adventures of Superman (1953) - S2 E3 "The man who Could Read Minds" - the Swami.
Biff Baker, U.S.A. (1953) - Shahab Hussein (as Larry Dobkin)
I Love Lucy, 2 episodes: "Equal Rights" and "Paris at Last" (1953-1956) - Waiter / Counterfeiter
Gunsmoke (1956-1960) - Jacklin /Outlaw Brand /Mr. Garcia
Mr. Adams and Eve (1957–1958) - Max Cassolini / Director
Richard Diamond, Private Detective (1957) - Warburton Flagge
The Silent Service (1957) - "The Ordeal of The S 38" - Chappie - mistakenly cast listed as Lawrence Bodkin
Adventures of the Falcon (1957) – Jack McKenzie in "Snake Eyes"
Trackdown, 3 episodes: "Look For the Woman", "The Boy", and "The End of the World" (1957-8) - Lee Caldwell / Joel Paine / Walter Trump 
Naked City (1958–1963) - Narrator
The Donna Reed Show (1958) - Dr. Winfield Graham
The Untouchables (1959-1960) - Gangster Dutch Schultz, Falcon, 1957, 
Have Gun – Will Travel (1957–1963) - Ranch Owner Billy Joe Kane, 1957; Col. Oliver Lacey, 1962, "Penelope"
The Rifleman (1958-1962) - Ben Judson / Don Chimera del Laredo / Gen. Philip H. Sheridan / Juan Argentez
Wanted: Dead or Alive - (1959) - Bartolo Baffler
Cheyenne (1960) - 'General Sheridan' *Credited as Larry Dobkin* Episode: "Gold, Glory and Custer - Requiem"
The DuPont Show with June Allyson (1960) - "So Dim the Light" - Kurt Reynolds
The Roaring 20s (1960-1961) -  Max Winslow / Big Lou Burnett
The Tab Hunter Show (1961) - "Holiday in Spain" — Calleja
Empire (1962) - Dr. Karr
The Munsters (1964) as director for episodes 1, 9, 10, and 13 
Do Not Go Gentle Into That Good Night (1967) - Dr. Gettlinger
The Big Valley (1968) - Ben Dawes
Star Trek: TOS (1969), one episode: "Charlie X"
Mission Impossible (1971), one episode: "Kitara" - Colonel Alex Kohler
The Streets of San Francisco (1972) - Gregory Praxas
The Waltons (1972–1981), director for 16 episodes
Sara (1976), as director of an episode
The Life and Times of Grizzly Adams (1974-1978), created the title character for the 1974 film and the TV series
Knight Rider (1982) - 'Col. Alvin B. Kincaid' Episode: "Inside Out"
Rock Hudson (1990) - actor Raoul Walsh
War and Remembrance (1989) - General George S. Patton
L.A. Law (1990-1994) - Judge Saul Edelstein
Matlock (TV series) (1991) - Marvin Shea 
Night Court (1991) - State Supreme Court Justice Welch
Star Trek: The Next Generation (1991), one episode: "The Mind's Eye" - Klingon ambassador Kell
NYPD Blue (2001) - Season 8, Episode 7, "In-Laws, Outlaws" - John Gilbert

Radio

Escape (1947-1954)
The Adventures of Ellery Queen - Ellery Queen
The New Adventures of Nero Wolfe (1950-1951) - Archie Goodwin
Gunsmoke (1952-1961)
Yours Truly, Johnny Dollar (1956-1960)
Lux Radio Theater
The Adventures of Philip Marlowe

Video game
Tom Clancy's Rainbow Six: Rogue Spear (1999) - Lukyan (voice)

References

External links
 

 Lawrence Dobkin biography at All Movie
 Lawrence Dobkin as The Saint

1919 births
2002 deaths
Male actors from New York City
American male screenwriters
American male radio actors
American male voice actors
American male television actors
American television directors
Writers from New York City
Male actors from Los Angeles
United States Army personnel of World War II
United States Army soldiers
Writers from Los Angeles
Western (genre) television actors
Screenwriters from New York (state)
Screenwriters from California
20th-century American male actors
20th-century American male writers
20th-century American screenwriters